Kap River Nature Reserve is a nature reserve that lies between the confluence of the Kap River and the southern bank of the Great Fish River near Port Alfred. Neighbouring it is the Great Fish River Mouth Wetland Nature Reserve.

History 
This  reserve was designated in 1990.

Biodiversity

Birds 
The reserve hosts 300 species of birds, including African finfoot, black-headed heron, crowned eagle, hornbill, lanner falcon, martial eagle and rock kestrel.

Mammals 
Mammals found in the reserve are Cape bushbuck, duiker, giraffe, impala, red hartebeest, reedbuck, warthog and zebra.

Activities 
There's hiking, mountain biking, canoeing and fishing (with permits) at the reserve.

See also 

 List of protected areas of South Africa

References 

Nature reserves in South Africa